Nerlinka is a rural locality (a village) in Sergeikhinskoye Rural Settlement, Kameshkovsky District, Vladimir Oblast, Russia. The population was 7 as of 2010.

Geography 
Nerlinka is located on the Nerl River, 25 km west of Kameshkovo (the district's administrative centre) by road. Kruglovo is the nearest rural locality.

References 

Rural localities in Kameshkovsky District